Barbara Paulus was the defending champion, of this tennis competition, but lost in the second round to Andrea Glass.

Conchita Martínez won in the final 6–0, 6–3 against Silvia Farina.

Seeds
A champion seed is indicated in bold text while text in italics indicates the round in which that seed was eliminated. The top two seeds received a bye to the second round.

  Conchita Martínez (champion)
  Joannette Kruger (quarterfinals)
  Henrieta Nagyová (semifinals)
  Silvia Farina (final)
  Sabine Appelmans (first round)
  Barbara Paulus (second round)
  Magdalena Grzybowska (semifinals)
  Virginia Ruano Pascual (first round)

Draw

Final

Section 1

Section 2

External links
 1998 Warsaw Cup by Heros Draw

Warsaw Open
1998 WTA Tour